Leon of Pella (Greek:) or Leo the Egyptian (4th century BC) was a historian, priest and theologian. He wrote the book On the Gods in Egypt, based on an apocryphal letter of Alexander the Great to his mother Olympias. He was a contemporary of Euhemerus and explained similarly the human origin of the gods.

The early Christian writers, in their controversy with the heathens, refer not infrequently to a Leo or Leon as "having admitted that the deities of the ancient gentile world had been originally men, agreeing in this respect with Euhemerus, with whom he was contemporary, or perhaps rather earlier.

Augustine, who is most explicit in his notice of him, says he was an Egyptian priest of high rank, "magnus antistes", and expounded the popular mythology to Alexander the Great, in a manner which, though differing from those, rationalistic explanations received in Greece, accorded with them in making the gods (including even the dii majorum gentium) to have been originally men.

Augustine refers to an account of the statements of Leo contained in a letter of Alexander to his mother. It is to be observed, that although Leon was high in his priestly rank at the time when Alexander was in Egypt (b. c. 332–331), his name is Greek; and Arnobius (Adv. Gentes, iv. 29) calls him Leo Pellaeus, Leo of Pella, an epithet which Fabricius does not satisfactorily explain. Euhemerus was also at the court of Cassander, the king of Macedon.

References
Jahrbuch Des Deutschen Archaeologischen Instituts
Dictionary of Greek and Roman Biography and Mythology by William Smith
Roman and European Mythologies by Yves Bonnefoy
Myth and Poetry in Lucretius by Monica Gale

Hellenistic-era historians
Hellenistic philosophy and religion
Ancient Pellaeans
4th-century BC Egyptian people
Ancient Macedonian historians
Ancient Macedonian priests
Alexander the Great in legend
4th-century BC Greek people
4th-century BC historians
4th-century BC writers
Ancient Greek historians known only from secondary sources